The 2022–23 Olympique Lyonnais Féminin season is the club's.

Season events
On 8 June, Olympique Lyonnais announced the singing of Sara Däbritz from Paris Saint-Germain on a contract until the summer of 2025.

On 28 June, Olympique Lyonnais extended their contract with Ellie Carpenter until 30 June 2026, and with Kysha Sylla until 30 June 2025.

On 18 July, Olympique Lyonnais announced the signing of Inès Jaurena from Girondins de Bordeaux to a one-year contract.

On 21 July, Olympique Lyonnais extended their contract with Amel Majri until 30 June 2026. The following day 22 July, Alyssia Paljevic extended her contract with Olympique Lyonnais until 30 June 2023.

On 27 July, Grace Kazadi left Olympique Lyonnais to sign for Guingamp.

On 9 August, Manon Revelli joined Guingamp whilst Sally Julini also joined Guingamp on loan.

On 19 September, Olympique Lyonnais announced the signing of Vanessa Gilles on loan from Angel City until 30 June 2023.

On 16 January, Olympique Lyonnais announced the signing of Melchie Dumornay from Stade Reims to a three-year contract starting on 1 July 2023.

On 17 January, Olympique Lyonnais announced that Alice Sombath had extended her contract with the club until 30 June 2026, and that Kysha Sylla had joined Dijon FCO on loan for the remainder of the season.

On 29 January, Olympique Lyonnais announced that Inès Jaurena had left the club after her contract was terminated by mutual agreement.

Squad

Out on loan

Transfers

In

Loans in

Out

Loans out

Released

Friendlies

Competitions

Overview

Trophée des Championnes

Division 1

Results summary

Results by matchday

Results

Table

Coupe de France

UEFA Champions League

Group stage

Knockout stage

Squad statistics

Appearances 

|-
|colspan="16"|Players away from the club on loan:
|-
|colspan="16"|Players who appeared for Olympique Lyonnais but left during the season:

|}

Goal scorers

Clean sheets

Disciplinary record

References 

Olympique Lyonnais
Olympique Lyonnais Féminin